Survivor: The Caribbean Islands is the first season of the Israeli edition of Survivor. Based on the popular reality game show Survivor, the series was shot between June and July, 2007, in Los Haitises National Park, Dominican Republic. It was produced by Reyif HeMeiri production company, with an approximated budget of $5,000,000. It is broadcast on the Channel 10.

The Sole Survivor was Naama Kasry, who defeated Noam Tor and Dan Mano in the final Tribal Council by a 5-4-0 vote. Naama received the grand prize of 1,000,000 ₪ prize: 645,000 ₪ in cash and an off-road car. Tor was named the audience's favorite player after winning a public vote.

Format changes

Although the main format is the same, this season introduced several notable differences from the American version of Survivor:

Filming length: This season was filmed over 52 days, compared to the 39-day length of most American seasons.
Airing format: This season aired twice a week, compared to the once-weekly airing schedule of the American version. The American version largely produces one episode for every three days, culminating in an elimination; this season had 36 episodes, with two episodes for every three days. The first episode of the week featured the Reward and Immunity Challenges, while the second featured the Double-Power Challenge, Island of the Dead battle and Tribal Council. On two occasions, the Tribal council wasn't aired during the week's second episode, but instead at the start of the next week's first episode.
Double-Power Challenge: A new type of individual challenge typically played the day after the Immunity Challenge. Before the merge, the challenge was competed by the members of the tribe that lost the previous day's immunity challenge, and the winner earned either a second vote at that night's Tribal Council (episodes 1–9) or individual immunity (episodes 10–15). After the merge, all contestants competed in the Double-Power challenge, and the winner received either the power to block two contestants from voting at that night's Tribal Council (episodes 16–19) or the ability to cast a second vote at Tribal Council (episode 20 onward).
Island of the Dead: A secluded area where voted out contestants competed against each other in duels to remain in the game. When only three contestants remained in the main game, the winner of the final Island of the Dead duel returned to the game. This twist has been used in other international versions of Survivor, and later appeared in the American version as Redemption Island. 
Endgame: The final four castaways competed in two immunity challenges to determine two of the three finalists. The jury and the two immune finalists then voted between the two remaining castaways to determine the third finalist. The votes were cast during the final day of filming in the Dominican Republic, and the votes were read shortly thereafter in a fortification next to Herzliya. The newly completed jury then interrogated the finalists but, unlike the American version, did not cast their ballots at the conclusion of the final Tribal Council. Instead, votes were cast months later during the live reunion at the Nokia Arena in Tel Aviv, and read immediately afterward.

Contestants

Future appearances
Dan Mano, Idan Kapon and Marina Kabisher returned for Survivor: Fans vs. Survivors. Naama Kasry returned for the 2019 season of Survivor: VIP. Liya Gil returned for the 2021 season of Survivor: VIP.

Season summary

Survivor Auction

Voting history

External links
Official Survivor 10 website 

The Caribbean
Channel 10 (Israeli TV channel) original programming
2007 Israeli television seasons
2008 Israeli television seasons
Television shows filmed in the Dominican Republic